The New Hampshire Northcoast Corporation  is a Class III railroad owned by Boston Sand & Gravel and offering freight service in parts of New Hampshire and Massachusetts in the United States. The company owns  of the former Boston and Maine Corporation's Conway Branch between Rollinsford and Ossipee, New Hampshire. The railroad's primary traffic is quarried sand. It interchanges cars with CSX in Dover, New Hampshire; the cars are then taken to the Boston Sand & Gravel plant in Charlestown, Massachusetts.

Other than the Boston gravel train, NHN also serves its own satellite gravel facility in Rochester, New Hampshire, as well as Eastern Propane at the same location and a few other freight customers. The company was founded in 1986 when the abandoned tracks were purchased. It has been proposed that the tracks be upgraded for passenger service between Boston and North Conway, New Hampshire.

NHN runs an average of two trains approximately five days a week: one southbound, and one northbound. The trains generally arrive at the pit in Ossipee around 11:00 AM and depart for the CSX interchange around 2:00 PM. "Shuttle" trains are run as needed to bring sand and gravel to the facility in Rochester. Once the train arrives in Dover, it assumes the CSX symbol DOBO (Dover to Boston) for the run to Boston. It returns as BODO (Boston to Dover) in the early morning. Until recently when they were replaced with a pair of EMD GP38-2s, the trains ran with several EMD GP9s.

Roster

The railroad also has an FURX GP38-2(5509) on lease and is not owned by the NHN.

References

Sources

New Hampshire Railroad Revitalization Association, "Preserving the Railroad System - An overview of New Hampshire's Activity: 1975 - 2000"

External links
 NH Northcoast homepage

New Hampshire railroads
Maine railroads
Spin-offs of Pan Am Railways